Francis Patrick "Frankie" Gilhooley Jr. (June 15, 1924 – November 19, 2010) was an American professional basketball player and long-time minor league baseball announcer for the Toledo Mud Hens. He played for the Toledo Jeeps in the National Basketball League for eight games during the 1946–47 season. In college he played both baseball and basketball for the University of Notre Dame.

In 1953, Gilhooley  began his broadcasting career as the radio voice of the Toledo Sox. Over the next 50+ years he held various roles in radio and television, at one point anchoring the evening sportscast segments on regional television. When the Mud Hens moved to their new facility in 2002, Fifth Third Field, the team named two concession areas, one on each concourse level, "Gilhooley's Grill." In addition to his baseball broadcasting career, Gilhooley also did play-by-play of Toledo and Bowling Green college basketball games.

References

Further reading
 

1924 births
2010 deaths
American men's basketball players
Basketball players from Ohio
College basketball announcers in the United States
Guards (basketball)
Minor League Baseball broadcasters
Notre Dame Fighting Irish baseball players
Notre Dame Fighting Irish men's basketball players
Sportspeople from Toledo, Ohio
Toledo Jeeps players
Toledo Mud Hens